Terje Bjørn Lerstad (born 1955 in  Oslo) is a Norwegian composer and clarinetist.

Lerstad completed his clarinet studies with Olav Rimstad at the Music Concervatory (today the Norwegian Academy of Music) in 1974. After high school, Lerstad studied clarinet with Richard Kjelstrup at the Norwegian Academy of Music, followed by bass clarinet studies with Harry Sparnaay in Holland. Lerstad graduated with a diploma from the Koninklijk Conservatorium, Haag in 1982.

From 1979 to 1981, Lerstad served as clarinetist in the Staff Band of the Norwegian Armed Forces, Halden. Lerstad’s debut concert came in February 1980, and from 1982 he was appointed bass clarinetist in the orchestra of the Norwegian National Opera and Ballet. Lerstad has founded ensembles Bozza Trio and Het Basklarinettencollektief. Lerstad has also been active as a soloist and has performed with the ASKO-ensemble during the Holland Festival in 1982, during the Ny Musikk 1987 Summer Festival, with the Norwegian Radio Orchestra at the 1992 Ultima Oslo Contemporary Music Festival, with the Stavanger Symphony Orchestra in 1993, at the ISCM Festival in Stockholm in 1995 and with Oslo Sinfonietta in 2000. Lerstad is a member of contemporary music ensembles Oslo Sinfonietta and Cikada.

As a composer, Lerstad is predominantly an autodidact, and has a list of works that has surpassed 200. His pre-1972 works are primarily written in a classic/neo-romantic style. The 70s would see a gradual move towards more complex use of harmony and rhythm, while the turn of the decade would see the composer focusing on pre-tonal music from the Renaissance and Medieval Ages as inspirational sources. Over the last three decades, his music has approached modernism, but Lerstad has not written twelve-tone or serial music, instead focusing on influences from renaissance music and traditional music styles from Tibet, Japan and the Balkans.

Production

Selected works
 Klarinettkonsert nr. 1 (1971/82)
 Blåserkvintett nr. 4 (1979/82)
 2 Stykker for saxofonkvartett (AATT), op. 79 (1975)
 Sonata for basson and piano, no.2 (1977)
 Requiem for stort blandet kor, op. 123 (1978)
 Symfoni nr. 4 (1982)
 Toccata, op. 183 (1986)

Discography
 Robert Rønnes, Eva Knardal, Norwegian Contemporary Music for Bassoon (1992)
 Cikada Ensemble, Cikada (1993)
 Lyrical Punk Clarinet (2003)

References

External links
List of works supplied by the National Library of Norway

1955 births
21st-century classical composers
Norwegian contemporary classical composers
Norwegian male classical composers
Living people
21st-century Norwegian male musicians